Galacticos Bireuen Football Club (simply known as Galacticos FC) is an Indonesian football club based in Kota Juang, Bireuën Regency, Aceh. They currently play in Liga 3.

Players

Current squad

Honours
 Liga 3 Aceh
 Runner-up: 2021
Liga 3 National
 Round of 64: 2021-22 (Group A)

References

External links

Football clubs in Indonesia
Football clubs in Aceh
Association football clubs established in 2010
2010 establishments in Indonesia